Coffee King was an informal title created in Brazil during the 19th century and used until the early 20th century. It was usually applied to the biggest coffee producer of a given period.

In spite of the lack of consensus around the exact number of Coffee Kings, there are sources pointing to at least five of them:

 
 Henrique Dumont
 
 Carlos Leôncio de Magalhães

See also

 Agriculture in Brazil
 Coffee cycle
 Coffee production in Brazil
 Coffee with milk politics
 Economic history of Brazil
 Fazenda, Brazilian plantations
 Taubaté Agreement

References

Agriculture in Brazil
Coffee production
19th century in Brazil